Yevgeniy Vladimirovich Petin (Евгений Владимирович Петин; born 29 January 1975) is an Uzbekistani triple jumper. His personal best jump is 16.67 metres, achieved in July 2000 in Moscow.

He competed at the 1996 Olympic Games, the 1997 World Championships and the 2000 Olympic Games without reaching the final. In the qualification of the triple jump, he showed the 34th result (15.27).

In the same year, he took 10th place at the Asian Athletics Championships in Jakarta (15.53).

International competitions

1No mark in the final

References 

sports-reference

1975 births
Living people
Uzbekistani male triple jumpers
Athletes (track and field) at the 1998 Asian Games
Athletes (track and field) at the 1996 Summer Olympics
Athletes (track and field) at the 2000 Summer Olympics
Olympic athletes of Uzbekistan
Asian Games competitors for Uzbekistan